Sky News Breakfast is a British breakfast television program that airs Saturday and Bank Holidays from 6–10am and Sunday from 6–8.30am on Sky News. The show launched on Friday, 18 October 2019 as the replacement for long-running breakfast show Sunrise.

Anna Jones is the programmes main presenter. Anna also hosts the Friday morning breakfast programme on the channel, Friday programmes are broadcast from Westminster rather than Osterley and use the same format as the Monday-Thursday programmes.

The show was one of Sky's final double headed formats - the other being Sky News Today - and was presented by Stephen Dixon and Gillian Joseph from Sky Centre in Osterley until January 2021.

History 
Sky News announced on 23 September 2019 that they were introducing two new breakfast shows to replace Sunrise. Alongside the announcement of Kay Burley, Sky News also announced "a slightly more relaxed style to kick off the weekend" in the form of Sky News Breakfast with Stephen Dixon and Gillian Joseph.

It aired for the first time on Friday, 18 October 2019. The show has a hard-news focus however is slightly more relaxed, containing human-interest stories, in comparison to the weekday format.

The show initially ran from Friday-Sunday however in September 2020, it became weekends only when a relaunched Kay Burley began broadcasting five days a week. At the same time, Sky News @ Breakfast was renamed Sky News Breakfast, with Sky dropping the @ from both breakfast shows.

By November 2021, there was no regular presenter for the programme, as Dixon left Sky News and Joseph moved to present Sky News at Ten at weekends. Jacquie Beltrao presents sport on the programme. In December 2021, the then-presenter of Early Rundown Niall Paterson was announced as the show's permanent host, starting in early 2022. However this changed once again later that same year with Anna Jones becoming the shows main presenter.

Broadcast 
The show currently airs from 6-10am on Saturdays and Bank Holidays and from 6–8.30am on Sundays, live from Sky Central in Osterley.

In January 2021, following Kay Burley’s breach of coronavirus regulations, the Sky News Breakfast name was used on programming guides for the weekday slot. However, both shows continued to broadcast differing formats. As a result of Burley’s absence, Gillian Joseph hosted the programme solo with Stephen Dixon covering Monday-Thursday editions of The Early Rundown whilst Niall Paterson was covering for Burley. From March 2021, Dixon and Paterson swapped roles, with Dixon hosting the Kay Burley slot until her return in June 2021.

The Sky News Breakfast branding is also used on Friday mornings where Anna Jones presents from 7-10am from Millbank, Westminster. Despite utilising the same branding and name, the Monday to Friday programme however differs from its weekend counterpart by having a politics-focused, hard-news agenda, a large input on social media and is also broadcast from different studios.

On-Air Team

Current presenters

Other relief sport and weather presenters appear during holiday and absences.

References

2019 British television series debuts
2020s British television series
Sky News
Sky television news shows
Sky UK original programming
English-language television shows